"Rise Up With Fists!!" is the first single from the album Rabbit Fur Coat by Jenny Lewis with the Watson Twins. It was released March 9, 2006 on Team Love. It was offered as a free single from the Canadian iTunes Music Store. The track also appeared on Uncut magazine's 2006 year-end Best Of compilation.

Music video
The music video, inspired by Hee Haw, features cameo appearances of Sarah Silverman, Jimmy Tamborello, and Morgan Nagler.

Track listing
 "Rise Up with Fists!!"
 "Paradise"
 "Rise Up with Fists!!" [Video]

External links
Jenny Lewis official website
Team Love Records
Rise Up with Fists!! at Amazon.com

2006 debut singles
Jenny Lewis songs
Rough Trade Records singles
The Watson Twins songs